Dina LaPolt is an entertainment lawyer and artist rights advocate based in Los Angeles, California. After an early career in the music industry, she became an entertainment lawyer in 1997. She is the founder and owner of LaPolt Law.

Early life and Education 
LaPolt became an attorney in 1997 after being in the music industry since she was 13. LaPolt was formerly a musician and performed in multiple rock bands on the East Coast in the 1980s and 1990s. LaPolt later became a club promoter and artist manager working for Streetgang Productions, and eventually obtained a bachelor's degree in music from the State University of New York at New Paltz.
 
In 1991 she relocated from New York City to the San Francisco Bay Area, where she taught guitar lessons to children and played lead guitar in the all-female band Irresistible Impulse. The band became influential in the gay and lesbian club scene, and LaPolt often used the stage to advocate for gay rights. In 1993, she enrolled in law school at John F. Kennedy University in Walnut Creek. Shortly after passing the California bar exam, LaPolt moved to Los Angeles in June 1997.

Career 
LaPolt's early entertainment law clients were various Playboy Playmates including Carrie Stevens and Victoria Silvstedt. In 2001 she founded LaPolt Law, a Los Angeles-based law firm representing some entertainers and entrepreneurs.

Among LaPolt’s earliest clients was the activist Afeni Shakur, mother of late rapper Tupac Shakur. From 1998 to 2010, LaPolt was the entertainment attorney for the Tupac Shakur estate, and served on the board of the Tupac Amaru Shakur Foundation and the Tupac Amaru Shakur Center for the Arts. Alongside Afeni Shakur, LaPolt oversaw the release of ten posthumous Tupac albums and several books, including The Rose That Grew from Concrete, 2Pac’s Greatest Hits, Better Dayz, and Until the End of Time.

In 2013, LaPolt assisted deadmau5 in settling his trademark dispute with The Walt Disney Company.  Disney argued that Zimmerman's signature mau5head headgear and logo resembled their Mickey Mouse cartoon character, thus attempting to block his trademark registration.

In October 2016, LaPolt gave a TED Talk on the importance of standing up for songwriters.

After the 2017 departure of Camila Cabello, LaPolt renegotiated Fifth Harmony's contract with Epic Records, and helped the group regain control of their brand.

In 2018 LaPolt took on The White House and for the second time shut down President Donald Trump for unlicensed use of her client, Steven Tyler's, music during Trump's rallies.

In February 2019, LaPolt helped secure the of her client, rapper 21 Savage (She'yaa Bin Abraham-Joseph) from U.S. Immigration and Customs Enforcement Detention after he was unfairly targeted by the Trump Administration due to his race and immigration status. On February 12, 2019, 21 Savage was released on bond.

In 2019 LaPolt became the youngest person and the second woman to receive The Recording Academy’s Service Award at its annual Entertainment Law Initiative event.  That same year she was inducted into Billboard’s Women in Music Hall of Fame.

From 2002 to 2019, LaPolt taught "Legal and Practical Aspects of the Music Business”  in the Entertainment Studies Department at UCLA Extension, and has taught and lectured throughout the U.S., Canada and Europe. She is the editor of the book, Building Your Artist’s Brand as a Business, published in 2012 by the International Association of Entertainment Lawyers in Cannes, France.

Film and Television 
LaPolt served as an executive producer of the reality series on AXS TV called Real Money, chronicling her client Eddie Money and his family of seven. The show was released in April 2018, and ran for two seasons. LaPolt also was an associate producer on Becoming Chaz, a documentary released in 2011 discussing the gender transformation of Chaz Bono.

LaPolt was a co-producer of the Oscar-nominated 2003 documentary Tupac: Resurrection. In 2022, LaPolt was engaged by the Shakur estate to produce Peace, Love & Respect: The Afeni Shakur Story, chronicling the activist’s work as a key figure in the Black Panther party.

Advocacy 
LaPolt has been involved in legislative advocacy efforts on behalf of the music community. In 2013, LaPolt helped write proposed legislation on the right of privacy for celebrities and other public figures in the state of Hawaii along with Senator Kalani English, D-Maui.  The “Steven Tyler Act” passed through the state Senate with only one opposing vote. Although the measure failed in the House of Representatives two months later, the legislation stayed active for two years.

She has also submitted comment papers to the United States Patent and Trademark Office, the United States Copyright Office and Department of Justice on various legislative issues. In October 2015, LaPolt spoke in front of members of the U.S. House Judiciary Committee at UCLA as part of their ongoing review of copyright law.

In 2015, LaPolt helped found songwriter advocacy group the Songwriters of North America (SONA) with songwriters Michelle Lewis and Kay Hanley. SONA has grown to now include over 600 songwriters including Kara DioGuardi, Siedah Garrett, Justin Tranter, Mozella, Busbee, Priscilla Renea, Diane Warren, Claudia Brant, Steven Tyler, Joe Perry, Rick Nowels, Darrell Brown, Dave Bassett, and 21 Savage. LaPolt also serves as an attorney advisor to the GRAMMY Creators Alliance, announced during the 2015 GRAMMY Awards broadcast.

In 2016,  orchestrated the filing of on behalf of the Songwriters of North America in connection with the DOJ's mandate requiring 100% licensing by each of the major Performing Rights Organizations.

In 2017, LaPolt worked with members of Congress to write and introduce the Music Modernization Act (MMA), which changed the way songwriters are paid for use of their works by streaming services. In April 2018, LaPolt was recognized on the floor of the U.S. House of Representatives by the MMA's author, Congressman Doug Collins, R-Ga., for her work spearheading the MMA. In September 2018, the Music Modernization Act was unanimously passed in the U.S. Senate.

In March 2020, again through the Songwriters of North America and as well as the Nashville Songwriters Association International, LaPolt was instrumental in advocating for independent contractors, sole proprietors, and the self employed to be added to the Federal Government's stimulus bill, the CARES Act, ensuring eligibility for artist's for federal relief during the COVID-19 pandemic.  The revisions to the bill allowed coverage for songwriters, producers, and music artists, as well as others in the music industry, whose business was disrupted due to the Government's stay-at-home mandates.

LaPolt is also an active member on the Executive Leadership Council of the Black Music Action Coalition. In 2021, she was honored for her activism in the Black community as the recipient of The Black Music Action Coalition’s Agent of Change Award alongside civil rights attorney Benjamin Crump.

In September 2022, working alongside Congressman Hank Johnson and Congressman Jamaal Bowman, LaPolt helped to develop new Federal legislation, the Restoring Artistic Protection (RAP) Act to the US House of Representatives .  The RAP Act “[protects] artist from the use of their lyrics against them as legal evidence in criminal and civil cases,” and is the first of its kind at the federal level.  The act is a layer of protection for the hip-hop genre in particular, a sector of music that LaPolt says the courts “fundamentally misunderstand” due to underlying racial prejudices.   The California version of the bill, the Decriminalizing Artistic Expression Act, was signed into California law by Governor Gavin Newsom on October 1, 2022.

Awards and honors 
2022 Variety's Legal Impact Report
2022 The Hollywood Reporter's Top Music Lawyers
2022 Billboard's Top Music Lawyers
2022 Billboard's Women In Music Hall of Fame Honoree
2022 Hits Daily Double Rainmaker
2022 Billboard Power 100 
2021 Variety's Women's Impact Report
2021 Black Music Action Coalition's Agent of Change Award
2021 Billboard's Top Music Lawyers
2021 Variety's Legal Impact Report
2021 Hollywood Reporter's Power Lawyers Top Music Business Attorneys
2020 Hollywood Reporter's Top Music Attorneys
2020 Billboard's Power 100 
2019 Billboard's Women In Music
2019 Hollywood Reporter's Power Lawyers Top Music Business Attorneys
2019 Variety's Legal Impact Report
2019 Recording Academy: Entertainment Law Initiative Service Award
2019 Billboard's Power 100
2018 Billboard's Women in Music: Executives of the Year
2018 MIDEM's Top Lawyer Award
2018 Hollywood Reporter's Power Lawyers Top Music Business Attorneys
2018 Variety's Legal Impact Report
2018 Billboard's Power 100
2017 Variety's Women's Impact Report
2017 Billboard's Women In Music
2017 Billboard's Top Music Lawyers
2017 Hollywood Reporter's Power Lawyers Top Music Business Attorneys
2016 Billboard's Women in Music
2016 Variety's Dealmakers Impact Report
2016 Billboard's Top Music Lawyers
2016 Hollywood Reporter's Power Lawyers Top Music Business Attorneys
2015 Association of Independent Music Publishers Individual Award for support of Songwriters and Publishers
2015 Billboard's Top Music Lawyers
2015 Hollywood Reporter's Power Lawyers Top Music Business Attorneys
2011 Best in Biz Awards: Best Music Business Attorney National Association of Record Industry Professionals

References

Living people
Year of birth missing (living people)
Lawyers from Los Angeles
John F. Kennedy University College of Law alumni
Place of birth missing (living people)
American LGBT businesspeople
20th-century American lawyers
20th-century American women lawyers
21st-century American lawyers
21st-century American women lawyers